The Vinarium Tower (Slovene: Stolp Vinarium, Hungarian: Vinarium torony; Vinarium Lendava, Panonnian Basin Lighthouse, Prekmurje Eiffel Tower) is a Slovenian steel construction  tall observation tower in Dolgovaške Gorice, a village in the middle of the Lendava Hills above Lendava. The architects are Oskar Virag and Iztok Rajšter from the Vires architectural office . This is the highest observation tower in Slovenia. The tower was officially opened on 2 September 2015. The tower allows views into four different countries: Slovenia, Hungary, Austria, and Croatia. The designers expect 30,000 to 50,000 visitors per year.

Construction
Construction was commenced on 13 January 2015 and finished between 15 and 25 July 2015. The SGP Pomgrad company was the main contractor, the Nafta Strojna company was responsible for steel construction, and the Mobitex company for producing steel construction as part of GOI works. The Atrij company from Odranci was the supervisor.

The tower cost almost €1.8 million; about €950,000 came from EU development funds and the rest of the financing was contributed by the Municipality of Lendava, the formal owner of the building.

Architecture
Structure: steel construction with reinforced concrete lobby
Overall height: 
Roof height: 
Observatory height:  
Top floor: 
Floor count: lobby + 9 floors 
Elevation: 
Lobby area:  
Capacity: 50 visitors
Volume: 
Total steps: 240
Elevators: 1

References

External links
Video presentation on YouTube

Towers completed in 2015
Lendava
Prekmurje
2015 establishments in Slovenia